Paro District (Dzongkha: སྤ་རོ་རྫོང་ཁག་; Wylie: Spa-ro rdzong-khag) is a district (dzongkhag), valley, river and town (population 20,000) in Bhutan. It is one of the most historic valleys in Bhutan. Both trade goods and invading Tibetans came over the pass at the head of the valley, giving Paro the closest cultural connection with Tibet of any Bhutanese district. The dominant language in Paro is Dzongkha, the national language.

Paro contains the only international airport in Bhutan, Paro Airport.

Geography

Paro District is bordered by Haa District to the west, Tibet to the north, Thimphu District to the east, and Chukha District to the south.

Administrative divisions
Paro Districts comprises ten village blocks (or gewogs):

Doga Gewog
Dopshari Gewog
Doteng Gewog
Hungrel Gewog
Lamgong Gewog
Lungnyi Gewog
Naja Gewog
Shapa Gewog
Tsento Gewog
Wangchang Gewog

Environment
Northern Paro District (the gewogs of Doteng and Tsento) contains part of Jigme Dorji National Park and the biological corridor connecting it to Torsa Strict Nature Reserve in neighboring Haa District.

Cultural sites

Important cultural sites of Paro include:
Taktshang, or Tiger's Nest, the most famous monastery and ancient highlights for the people of Bhutan. It was founded as a meditating cave by the famous saint Guru Padmasambhava in the early 8th century upon subjugating a demon and forcing him to take an oath to be the local protector of the region towards the very end.
Kyichu Lhakhang, which along with Jambay Lhakhang in central Bhutan is the oldest temple in Bhutan, dating to the 7th century.
Drukgyel Dzong, at the upper end of the valley, built to protect against invading Tibetans, but in ruins since a fire in the 1950s.
Paro Town, the single market town in the dzonghag which is booming (by Bhutanese standards) due to an influx of tourist dollars.
Rinpung Dzong, also known as Paro Dzong, the massive fortress/monastery which is also the administrative center of the dzonkhag. Scenes from the movie Little Buddha were filmed in and around this dzong.
The National Museum of Bhutan, where visitors can learn about the culture of Bhutan.

Economy
Druk Air, the national airline of Bhutan, has its headquarters in Paro.

Paro Indian Military Base
Paro is the Indian Army's second military base outside its territory, the first one being Farkhor Air Base in Tajikistan where India also renovated but did not occupy the Ayni Air Base.

See also

Damthang
Districts of Bhutan
Paro Province

References

External links

Paro dzongkhag administration official Web site

 
Districts of Bhutan